Firefly protocol may refer to:

 Firefly (cache coherence protocol), a cache coherence protocol used in the DEC Firefly workstation
 Firefly (key exchange protocol), a cryptographic protocol developed by NSA